The Assistant Secretary of the Treasury for Financial Markets is an official in the United States Department of the Treasury who heads the Office of Financial Markets. The office is currently held by Joshua Frost.

According to U.S. statute, there are ten Assistant Secretaries of the Treasury appointed by the President of the United States with the advice and consent of the United States Senate.  The Assistant Secretary of the Treasury for Financial Markets reports to the Under Secretary of the Treasury for Domestic Finance, who in turn reports to the United States Secretary of the Treasury and the United States Deputy Secretary of the Treasury.

List of Assistant Secretaries of the Treasury for Financial Markets

See also
Assistant Secretary of the Treasury

References